A Mexican standoff  is a confrontation where no strategy exists that allows any party to achieve victory. Any party initiating aggression might trigger their own demise. At the same time, the parties are unable to extract themselves from the situation without suffering a loss. As a result, all participants need to maintain the strategic tension, which remains unresolved until some outside event or interparty dialogue makes it possible to resolve it.

The term Mexican standoff was originally used in the context of using firearms and it still commonly implies a situation in which the parties face some form of threat from the other parties. The Mexican standoff is a recurring cinematic trope, in which several armed characters hold each other at gunpoint.

Etymology 
Sources claim the reference is to the Mexican–American War or post-war Mexican bandits in the 19th century.

The earliest known use of the phrase in print was on 19 March 1876, in a short story about Mexico. An American is being held up by a Mexican bandit, with the outcome:

Popular culture 
In popular culture, the term Mexican standoff is used in reference to confrontations in which neither opponent appears to have a measurable advantage. Historically, commentators have used the term to reference the Soviet Union – United States nuclear confrontation during the Cold War, specifically the Cuban Missile Crisis of 1962. The key element that makes such situations Mexican standoffs is the equality of power exercised amongst the involved parties. The inability of any particular party to advance its position safely is a condition common amongst all standoffs; in a "Mexican standoff", however, there is an additional disadvantage: no party has a safe way to withdraw from its position, thus making the standoff effectively permanent.

In financial circles, the Mexican standoff is typically used to denote a situation where one side wants something, a concession of some sort, and is offering nothing of value. When the other side sees no value in agreeing to any changes, they refuse to negotiate. Although both sides may benefit from the change, neither side can agree to adequate compensation for agreeing to the change, and nothing is accomplished.

A Mexican standoff where each party is threatening another with a gun is now considered a movie cliché, stemming from its frequent use as a plot device in cinema. The classic exemplar of the trope is in Sergio Leone's 1966 Western The Good, the Bad and the Ugly, where the eponymous characters, played by Clint Eastwood, Lee Van Cleef and Eli Wallach, face each other in a showdown.

Director John Woo, considered a major influence on the action film genre, is known for his highly chaotic action sequences, Mexican standoffs, and frequent use of slow motion. Director Quentin Tarantino (who has cited Woo as an influence) has featured Mexican standoff scenes in films including Inglourious Basterds (the tavern scene features multiple Mexican standoffs including meta-discussion) and Reservoir Dogs, which depicts a standoff between four characters in the climactic scene.

See also

References

External links 
 

English-language idioms
Cinematic techniques
Dilemmas
Slang
Violence
English phrases
Phrases